Kauê da Silva, known simply as Kauê (born 4 January 1997) is a Brazilian football player who plays for Portuguesa.

Club career
He made his Campeonato Paulista debut for Botafogo SP on 22 February 2017 in a game against Audax.

On 18 October 2020, Kauê joined Portuguesa Santista.

References

External links
 

1997 births
Footballers from São Paulo
Living people
Brazilian footballers
Brazilian expatriate footballers
Association football forwards
Sociedade Esportiva Palmeiras players
Botafogo Futebol Clube (SP) players
Oeste Futebol Clube players
Clube Atlético Linense players
Guarani FC players
FC Lviv players
Sampaio Corrêa Futebol Clube players
Vila Nova Futebol Clube players
Associação Portuguesa de Desportos players
Associação Atlética Portuguesa (Santos) players
Campeonato Brasileiro Série B players
Campeonato Brasileiro Série C players
Ukrainian Premier League players
Expatriate footballers in Ukraine
Brazilian expatriate sportspeople in Ukraine